The tools listed here support emulating or simulating APIs and software systems. They are also called API mocking tools, service virtualization tools, over the wire test doubles and tools for stubbing and mocking HTTP(S) and other protocols. They enable component testing in isolation.

In alphabetical order by name (click on a column heading to sort by that column):

See also 
 Test double
 Service virtualization

References 

Computing comparisons